Cobb Virtual Academy (CVA) is an education program created and provided by the Cobb County School District in Georgia, United States. It is a separate entity from the Georgia Virtual School, an initiative by the Georgia Department of Education to provide virtual learning to students in public and private schools. The director is Ryan Fuller.

Preliminary meetings, finals, and End of Course Tests are all done in person. Most assignments simply require composing a text document or completing a downloaded worksheet and emailing it to a teacher.

One or two of these classes may be taken during each of the normal school years with limited seats for each. There are 45 different classes available.

External links
 Official site

Public high schools in Georgia (U.S. state)
Education in Cobb County, Georgia
Alternative education